Krasnoselsk may refer to:
Krasnoselsk, Russia, name of several rural localities in Russia
Krasnoselsk, former name of Chambarak, Armenia
Krasnoselsk, former name of Qara Nuru, Azerbaijan

See also
Krasnoselsky (disambiguation)